Allan Everett (12 April 1913 – 22 October 2003) was an Australian rules footballer who played with and coached Geelong in the Victorian Football League (VFL).

A hard running rebound defender, Everett was used mostly in the back pockets. He came to Geelong from Lismore and spent some of his early games at half forward. Everett, a dual VFL interstate representative, was a member of Geelong's premiership team in 1937. He was captain-coach of Geelong for part of the 1940 season and steered the club to seven wins.

He crossed to Victorian Football Association club Preston without a clearance in 1941.

Footnotes

References
Holmesby, Russell and Main, Jim (2007). The Encyclopedia of AFL Footballers. 7th ed. Melbourne: Bas Publishing.

External links

 The VFA Project: Alan Everett.

1913 births
Australian rules footballers from Victoria (Australia)
Geelong Football Club players
Geelong Football Club Premiership players
Geelong Football Club coaches
Preston Football Club (VFA) players
2003 deaths
One-time VFL/AFL Premiership players